A monument of Italian general and nationalist Giuseppe Garibaldi, one of the leaders of Italian unification, is located in Taganrog, one of the largest ports in Russia. Built in 1961, the monument commemorates Garibaldi’s visit to Taganrog in April 1833, and it celebrates the friendship between Italy and Russia.

Visits of Giuseppe Garibaldi to Taganrog

Giuseppe Garibaldi first came to Taganrog in April 1833.

History of the Monument

In 1961 Taganrog paid the tribute to the staying of Garibaldi with one of the downtown streets named after him (Ulitsa Garibaldi), and with an obelisk in honor of Garibaldi not far from the seaport where stood his schooner Clorinda.

The obelisk is a 5-meter high stella representing the flying banner. The description on the backside reads: In 1833, Giuseppe Garibaldi took an oath of dedicating his life to liberation and unification of his Homeland – Italy. Under leadership of the national hero Giuseppe Garibaldi, the country was liberated and unified. On the front side, it says: In the person of Garibaldi Italy had a hero of antique kind, who was capable of producing miracles and who produced miracles (Friedrich Engels).

The obelisk in honor of Garibaldi’s visit to Taganrog was inaugurated on June 2, 1961 for the centenary of Italy’s liberation. The local artist Yakovenko realized the project of the monument. The bas-relief (Italian hero’s profile and a palm branch) was produced by the artist Baranov. In 1986, the bas-relief was replaced due to technical reasons and a new bas-relief by the artist Beglov was installed.

The photograph of the Taganrog's Giuseppe Garibaldi monument was displayed at the exhibition "Hero of Two Worlds: Monuments to Garibaldi Across the World" that opened at the Garibaldi-Meucci Museum in New York City on July 21, 2007.

September 12, 2007, a new renovated Giuseppe Garibaldi monument was unveiled during celebrations of the "City Day" and within the program of the events dedicated to Giuseppe Garibaldi bicentenary in Taganrog. Annita Garibaldi-Jallet, granddaughter of the Italian revolutionary and representatives of the Italian embassy in Moscow participated in the event.  The quotation from Friedrich Engels was removed from the front side, the description on the back side remained unchanged.

This is the only monument in honor of Giuseppe Garibaldi in the former Soviet Union.

Old and Modern Views of the Garibaldi Monument in Taganrog

References
Notes 

Sources
 The Taganrog Encyclopaedia, 2nd edition, 2003
 materials of the Taganrog State Archive and Taganrog Local Government
 "Таганрогская Правда" №22 (153-155) 2-8/06/2006 г. стр.14 "Историческая встреча"

Monuments and memorials built in the Soviet Union
Outdoor sculptures in Russia
1961 sculptures
Monuments and memorials in Taganrog
Italy–Soviet Union relations
1961 establishments in the Soviet Union
Cultural depictions of Giuseppe Garibaldi
Statues of politicians
Cultural heritage monuments in Taganrog
Cultural heritage monuments of regional significance in Rostov Oblast